Olsi Krasniqi (born 28 June 1992) is an Albanian professional rugby league footballer who plays as a  for the London Broncos in the Betfred Championship. 

He previously played for Harlequins Rugby League in the Super League, and on loan from London at the London Skolars in League 1. Krasniqi played for the Salford Red Devils in the Super League, and on loan from Salford at the North Wales Crusaders in Kingstone Press League 1. He also played for the Toronto Wolfpack in the Betfred Championship, and on loan from Toronto at the Bradford Bulls in the Championship.

Background
Krasniqi was born in Tirana, Albania; after his family moved to England he grew up in Feltham, London. His father is a professional wrestler from Albania.

Career

Harlequins RL / London Broncos
He made his first team début as a 17-year-old for Harlequins RL in 2010's Super League XV; coming off the interchange bench to score a try on début in a 50–22 win over Crusaders RL.

He spent time on loan from the Broncos at the London Skolars in League 1 in 2012 and 2013.

Salford Red Devils
Krasniqi joined the Salford Red Devils ahead of the 2015 Super League season.

He spent time on loan from Salford at the North Wales Crusaders in Kingstone Press League 1.

Toronto Wolfpack
He joined the Toronto Wolfpack ahead of the 2018 RFL Championship season.

Krasniqi also spent time on loan from Toronto at the Bradford Bulls in the Betfred Championship.

London Broncos
Krasniqi left the Wolfpack to return to the London Broncos part way through the 2019 Super League season.

Club statistics

References

External links

London Broncos profile
Toronto Wolfpack profile
SL profile

1992 births
Living people
Albanian emigrants to England
Albanian rugby league players
Bradford Bulls players
London Broncos players
London Skolars players
North Wales Crusaders players
People from Feltham
People from Tropojë
Rugby league locks
Rugby league props
Salford Red Devils players
Sportspeople from Tirana
Toronto Wolfpack players